Northcote is a suburb on the northern side of Christchurch, New Zealand.

Etymology
The suburb is named for the British politician, Stafford Northcote (1818–1887).

Demographics

Northcote had a population of 2,622 at the 2018 New Zealand census, an increase of 96 people (3.8%) since the 2013 census, and an increase of 75 people (2.9%) since the 2006 census. There were 1,014 households. There were 1,278 males and 1,344 females, giving a sex ratio of 0.95 males per female. The median age was 39.6 years (compared with 37.4 years nationally), with 435 people (16.6%) aged under 15 years, 504 (19.2%) aged 15 to 29, 1,233 (47.0%) aged 30 to 64, and 453 (17.3%) aged 65 or older.

Ethnicities were 72.3% European/Pākehā, 9.3% Māori, 2.3% Pacific peoples, 20.4% Asian, and 3.8% other ethnicities (totals add to more than 100% since people could identify with multiple ethnicities).

The proportion of people born overseas was 30.2%, compared with 27.1% nationally.

Although some people objected to giving their religion, 45.4% had no religion, 43.1% were Christian, 1.9% were Hindu, 0.5% were Muslim, 0.7% were Buddhist and 2.6% had other religions.

Of those at least 15 years old, 420 (19.2%) people had a bachelor or higher degree, and 429 (19.6%) people had no formal qualifications. The median income was $32,100, compared with $31,800 nationally. The employment status of those at least 15 was that 1,122 (51.3%) people were employed full-time, 300 (13.7%) were part-time, and 102 (4.7%) were unemployed.

References

Suburbs of Christchurch
Populated places in Canterbury, New Zealand